The NHS is the National Health Service, the four publicly funded health care services in the United Kingdom, considered collectively.

NHS may also refer to:

Health care
 Niagara Health System, a multiple hospital amalgamation in Niagara Region, Ontario, Canada
 National Health Service (England), the healthcare service of England
 NHS England, the oversight body responsibly for the provision of healthcare services in England
 NHS Scotland, the health and social care service of Scotland, overseen by Healthcare Improvement Scotland
 NHS Wales, the healthcare service of Wales, overseen by Public Health Wales
 Health and Social Care in Northern Ireland, the health and social care service of Northern Ireland, overseen by the Public Health Agency of Northern Ireland

Schools

 New Hampton School, New Hampshire, US
 Newmarket High School, Ontario, Canada
 Newport High School (Bellevue, Washington), US
 Niceville High School, Florida, US
 Niwot High School, Colorado, US
 Noblesville High School, Indiana, US
 North High School (Bakersfield, California), US
 Northport High School New York, US
 Norwood High School (Massachusetts), US
 School of Nursing and Health Studies, Georgetown University in Washington, D.C., US
 Sioux City North High School, Iowa, US
 Northgate High School (Walnut Creek, California), US
 Northwood High School (Irvine, California), US

Other uses
 NHS (gene)
 NHS Credit Union, for NHS employees, Glasgow, Scotland
 National Highway System (United States)
 National Historic Sites of Canada
 National Historic Site (United States)
 National Honor Society, United States
 Newport Historical Society, an American historical organization
 Ninja High School, an American comic book
 N-Hydroxysuccinimide, a reagent used in organic synthesis
 Independent Trade Unions of Croatia, or Nezavisni Hrvatski Sindikati (NHS)
 National Household Survey, of the Canada 2011 Census